USS Oconee (AOG-34) was a  acquired by the U.S. Navy for the dangerous task of transporting gasoline to warships in the fleet, and to remote Navy stations.

Oconee, formerly MC Hull 1531, was laid down under a Maritime Commission contract on 18 October 1944 by East Coast Shipyard, Inc., Bayonne, New Jersey; launched 19 November 1944; sponsored by Miss Ethel Borst; acquired by the Navy on 23 December 1944; and commissioned 12 January 1945.

World War II service  
Following shakedown in the Chesapeake Bay, Oconee, manned by a U.S. Coast Guard crew, sailed to Bermuda and Aruba before transiting the Panama Canal 15 March 1945. Stopping briefly at San Diego, California, the gasoline tanker proceeded to Pearl Harbor, arriving there 4 May. After a short upkeep period she sailed unescorted to Eniwetok, Marshall Islands, thence on to Ulithi. From mid-June to the end of July she serviced all sizes of ships and craft in the huge anchorage then steamed to Okinawa with her vital cargo. She remained there through the end of the war, serving ships of the mighty U.S. fleet and riding out two treacherous typhoons.

Post-war decommissioning  
On 12 November Oconee sailed for San Francisco, California, stopping at Pearl Harbor before arriving on 28 December. She decommissioned there on 28 March 1946, was struck from the Navy List on 1 May, and returned to the Maritime Commission on 1 July.  She was sold for commercial service, as M/V Piratini, and reflagged Brazilian.  She was scrapped in November 2003.

Military awards and honors 
Oconees crew was eligible for the following medals:
 American Campaign Medal
 Asiatic-Pacific Campaign Medal
 World War II Victory Medal
 Navy Occupation Service Medal (with Asia clasp)

References

External links 
 NavSource Online: Service Ship Photo Archive - AOG-34 Oconee

 

Mettawee-class gasoline tankers
Type T1-M-A2 tankers of the United States Navy
Ships built in Bayonne, New Jersey
1944 ships
World War II auxiliary ships of the United States